Mammillaria rekoi is a species of cactus from Mexico.

References

Cacti of Mexico
rekoi